The Voice: la plus belle voix (season 2) was the second season of the French reality singing competition, created by media tycoon John de Mol.  It was aired from February 2013 to May 2013 on TF1.

One of the important premises of the show is the quality of the singing talent. Four coaches, themselves popular performing artists, train the talents in their group and occasionally perform with them. Talents are selected in blind auditions, where the coaches cannot see, but only hear the auditioner.

The coaches were Florent Pagny, Jenifer, Louis Bertignac and Garou. The Second Season ended on May 18, 2013, Yoann Fréget was declared the winner.

Overview

 – Winning Coach/Contestant. Winner and finalists are in bold, eliminated contestants in small font.
 – Runner-Up Coach/Contestant. Final contestant first listed.
 – 2nd Runner-Up Coach/Contestant. Final contestant first listed.

The Canadian singer Jeanick Fournier was approached to participate in the show. She has been on tour since 2006 with a show entirely devoted to Celine Dion. Fournier is directly selected to be one of the 140 finalists. Having revealed her selection to the press, her audition was canceled the next day. In 2022, she is the winner of the second season of Canada's Got Talent. She was given the golden buzzer by host Lindsay Ell.

Results

Stage 1 : « Auditions à l'aveugle » (Blind Auditions)
The Blind Auditions were broadcast on 2, 9, 16, 23 February and 2 and 9 March 2013.

Episode 1: February 2, 2013

Episode 2: February 9, 2013

Episode 3: February 16, 2013

Episode 4: February 23, 2013 

*Already auditioned in season 1, where all four judges turned their chairs for her. She chose Garou but was eliminated during the battle rounds against Blandine Aggery. She auditioned with Stop! of Sam Brown

Episode 5: March 2, 2013

Episode 6: March 9, 2013

Stage 2 : « Battles Musicales » (Musical Battles)
During the battles round, each coach was assisted by two singers each as assistant coaches during the preparations to the show.
Florent Pagny was assisted by Chimène Badi and Lara Fabian;
Jenifer was assisted Christophe Willem and Alain Chamfort;
Louis Bertignac was assisted by Joyce Jonathan and Paul Personne;
Garou was assisted by Patrick Fiori and Grégoire.

Episode 7: March 16, 2013

Episode 8: March 23, 2013

Episode 9: March 30, 2013

Episode 10: April 6, 2013 

Teams after the battle rounds
Contestants retained after battle rounds, who will go to the live rounds (in blue, the contestants stolen by other teams) :

Stage 3 : « Primes » (Live Shows)
The primes were broadcast in 6 episodes including 3 in the initial rounds, and one each for quarter finals, semi-finals and the final.

Episode 11 - Prime 1: 13 April 2013
In the initial; primes, each coach presents 5 contestants. One is voted by the public, one saved by the coach and three are eliminated. In total, each coach will drop 6 of his contestants to end up with just four each

 – Contestant saved by the public vote
 – Contestant saved by coach
 – Contestant eliminated

Episode 12 - Prime 2: 20 April 2013
 – Contestant saved by the public vote
 – Contestant saved by coach
 – Contestant eliminated

Contestants after two rounds of prime shows

Episode 13 - Prime 3: 27 April 2013
In the Top 16 stage (four for each coach), public vote saves one contestant and the coach saves another of his team, eliminating the remaining two from his team  
 – Contestant saved by the public vote
 – Contestant saved by coach
 – Contestant eliminated

List of songs outside competition

Episode 14 - Prime 4 - Quarter-finals: 4 May 2013
Top 12, with three remaining contestants per team perform with one each saved by the public vote, one saved by coach and one eliminated per team. Eight contestants will remain in competition at the end of the quarter-finals and will tour France at the end of the season. 
 
 – Contestant saved by the public vote
 – Contestant saved by coach
 – Contestant eliminated

*Presence of Fauve Hautot during the performancelors de la chanson

Performances outside competition

Songs outside competition

Episode 15 - Prime 5 - Semi-finals: 11 May 2013
In the semi-finals and the finals, the two best candidates per team qualify in each team.

Votes are based on 150 points in total: Each coach would place his 50 points between his final 2 contestants. He should not distribute them equally but should give advantage to one of his /her two finalists. The votes of the public will be allocated based on votes for a total of 100 points. One contestant per team reaches the final.

 – Contestant qualifies to the final
 – Contestant eliminated

Performances outside competition

Episode 16 - Prime 6 - Finals: 18 May 2013
The final was broadcast live on 18 May 2013. The four finalists, the best in each team would compete against each other for the first and last time during the show, as all previous confrontations were contestants from their own respective teams.

Each finalist would sing four songs each. One with their respective coaches, a song with a well-known artist and two songs in solo (one in French and one in English). Only the public decides the season winner.

Five artists were invited to perform in the finals. Will.i.am performed four songs with all four finalists. The other four, being Lara Fabian, Patrick Bruel, Christophe Maé et Zaz accompanied one of the finalists each in their songs.

Winner of the season would win 150,000 Euros and a contract with an important record label.

At the end, the coaches sang "Stand by Me" from Ben E. King.

The four finalistes sont :

Performances outside competition

References

External links
 The Voice: la plus belle voix Official website

2013 French television seasons
The Voice: la plus belle voix